Arthur Smyth (19 February 1706 – 14 December 1771) was Archbishop of Dublin from 1766 until his death in 1771.

Family
Smyth was the son of Thomas Smyth, Bishop of Limerick, and Dorothea Burgh (daughter of Ulysses Burgh, Bishop of Ardagh). His brothers included Charles Smyth, MP for Limerick, and the lawyer George Smyth.

Career
Smyth studied at Trinity College, Dublin, and completed his studies in Oxford. He was Dean of Raphoe from 1742 until 1744, then Dean of Derry until 1752. He was then raised to the episcopate as Bishop of Clonfert and Kilmacduagh (1752), Down and Connor (1753) and Meath (1765), prior to his nomination as Archbishop of Dublin. He was the first Irish-born Archbishop of Dublin for many years. He was not widely seen as a very spiritual man: critics said that his main interest was the advancement of the careers of his numerous relatives.

References

1707 births
Deans of Raphoe
Deans of Derry
Bishops of Clonfert and Kilmacduagh
Bishops of Down and Connor (Church of Ireland)
Anglican bishops of Meath
Anglican archbishops of Dublin
1771 deaths
Members of the Irish House of Lords
Irish Anglican archbishops